This article contains lists of Monuments of National Importance in India.

An Archaeological Sites and Remains Act, 1958 defines an "Ancient Monument" as follows:

A "Monument of National Importance" is designated by the Archaeological Survey of India and includes the following:

The remains of an ancient monument
The site of an ancient monument
The land on which there are fences or protective covering structures for preserving the monument
Land by means of which people can freely access the monument

Table of monuments
The Monuments of National Importance are designated by the Archaeological Survey of India (ASI). The union government of India is authorised to maintain, protect and promote the Monuments of National Importance.

See also
 State Protected Monuments of India
 National Geological Monuments of India
 List of World Heritage Sites in India
 List of Water Heritage Sites in India
 List of rock-cut temples in India
 List of forts in India
 List of museums in India

References

External links

PIB